Hill's Sawmill, also known as the Holbert & Branning Mill and Duck Harbor Lumber & Chemical Co., is an historic sawmill which is located in Damascus Township, Wayne County, Pennsylvania.

It was added to the National Register of Historic Places in 1974.

History and architectural features
Built in 1873, Hill's Sawmill is a two-story, rectangular building with a gable roof, which is seventy feet long and twenty-five feet wide and sits on a stone foundation.

It contains original mill equipment.

It was added to the National Register of Historic Places in 1974.

References

Industrial buildings and structures on the National Register of Historic Places in Pennsylvania
Industrial buildings completed in 1873
Buildings and structures in Wayne County, Pennsylvania
Sawmills in the United States
National Register of Historic Places in Wayne County, Pennsylvania
1873 establishments in Pennsylvania